William Delgado (born 22 September 1966) is a Colombian wrestler. He competed in the men's freestyle 48 kg at the 1988 Summer Olympics.

References

External links
 

1966 births
Living people
Colombian male sport wrestlers
Olympic wrestlers of Colombia
Wrestlers at the 1988 Summer Olympics
Place of birth missing (living people)
Pan American Games medalists in wrestling
Pan American Games bronze medalists for Colombia
Wrestlers at the 1987 Pan American Games
Medalists at the 1987 Pan American Games
20th-century Colombian people
21st-century Colombian people